Graw or GRAW may refer to:
 Joseph P. Graw, American businessman and politician
 Ghost Recon Advanced Warfighter, a 2006 video game

See also 
 
 McGraw (disambiguation)
 Grau (disambiguation)
 Grao (disambiguation)